The Southeast Finland constituency (Finnish: Kaakkois-Suomen vaalipiiri, Swedish: Sydöstra Finlands valkrets) is a Finnish constituency represented in the Parliament of Finland. It covers the regions of South Karelia, Southern Savonia and Kymi Valley. The South-Eastern district currently elects 17 members to the parliament. The district was formed in 2013 by merging the electoral districts of Southern Savonia and Kymi into one.

Members of parliament

2015–2019
Juho Eerola (Finns)
Antti Häkkänen (NCP)
Heli Järvinen (Greens)
Anneli Kiljunen (SDP)
Jukka Kopra (NCP)
Hanna Kosonen (Centre)
Suna Kymäläinen (SDP)
Jari Leppä (Centre)
Jari Lindström (Finns)
Jani Mäkelä (Finns)
Sirpa Paatero (SDP)
Markku Pakkanen (Centre)
Satu Taavitsainen (SDP)
Kimmo Tiilikainen (Centre)
Lenita Toivakka (NCP)
Ari Torniainen (Centre)
Kaj Turunen (Finns)

2019–2023
Juho Eerola (Finns)
Hanna Holopainen (Greens)
Antti Häkkänen (NCP)
Heli Järvinen (Greens)
Ville Kaunisto (NCP)
Anneli Kiljunen (SDP)
Jukka Kopra (NCP)
Hanna Kosonen (Centre)
Suna Kymäläinen (SDP)
Kristian Sheikki Laakso (Finns)
Jari Leppä (Centre)
Niina Malm (SDP)
Jani Mäkelä (Finns)
Sirpa Paatero (SDP)
Ari Torniainen (Centre)
Ano Turtiainen (Finns)
Paula Werning (SDP)

References

See also
 Constituencies of Finland

Parliament of Finland electoral districts
South Karelia
South Savo
Kymenlaakso